Cochlostoma parnonis is a species of small land snail with an operculum, a terrestrial gastropod mollusc in the family Cochlostomatidae.

Geographic distribution 
C. parnonis is endemic to Greece, where it occurs in the south-eastern part of the Peloponnese peninsula.

References

Diplommatinidae
Molluscs of Europe
Endemic fauna of Greece